Rear Admiral William Codrington CB (21 February 1832 – 29 July 1888) was a Royal Navy officer who went on to be Junior Naval Lord.

Naval career
Codrington appointed a Lieutenant in the Royal Navy in 1855. Promoted to Captain in 1869, he was given command of HMS Narcissus, HMS Lord Warden and then HMS Hercules. He was appointed Private Secretary to the First Lord of the Admiralty in 1876 and Captain of the Steam Reserve at Portsmouth in 1880. He went on to be Captain of the Gunnery School at Portsmouth in 1881, Director of Naval Ordnance in 1882, Captain-superintendent of Sheerness Dockyard in 1883 and Junior Naval Lord in 1885. His last appointment was as Admiral-Superintendent of Chatham Dockyard in 1886.

Family
In 1879 he married Mary Auber Leach. His eldest son was H. W. Codrington.

References

1832 births
1888 deaths
Royal Navy rear admirals
Companions of the Order of the Bath
Lords of the Admiralty